The 1934 George Washington Colonials football team was an American football team that represented George Washington University as an independent during the 1934 college football season. In its sixth season under head coach Jim Pixlee, the team compiled a 6–3–1 record and outscored opponents by a total of 102 to 29. The team defeated Tulsa, Wake Forest, West Virginia, and Oklahoma, tied with Denver, and lost to North Dakota, Vanderbilt, and LSU.

Schedule

References

George Washington
George Washington Colonials football seasons
George Washington Colonials football